Cyclostrema archeri is a species of sea snail, a marine gastropod mollusk in the family Liotiidae.

Description

The height of the depressed shell attains 1.5 mm. The shell is rather widely umbilicated. The spire is scarcely elevated. The rounded whorls contain regular convex longitudinal ribs. The interstices are finely spirally lirate. The peristome is thickened.

Distribution
This species occurs in the Indian Ocean off Réunion.

References

External links
 To World Register of Marine Species
 

archeri
Gastropods described in 1888